The Fargo-Moorhead Toll Bridge is a former toll bridge on the Red River of the North between Fargo, North Dakota and Moorhead, Minnesota. It connects Moorhead's 15th Avenue N with Fargo's 12th Avenue N.

The bridge was to be privately operated until June 1, 2018, following a five-year extension of its original 25-year charter in 2013.

In May 2014, The City of Moorhead sued Bridge Co., the owners of the bridge; and the city of Fargo. Judge Frank Racek ruled in favor of the city of Moorhead and that the ownership of the bridge would be transferred to the two cities.

See also

References

Former toll bridges in Minnesota
Toll bridges in North Dakota
Road bridges in North Dakota
Road bridges in Minnesota
Fargo, North Dakota
Moorhead, Minnesota
Transportation in Cass County, North Dakota
Transportation in Clay County, Minnesota
Bridges completed in 1988